This article attempts to list the oldest extant buildings surviving in the state of Idaho in the United States of America, including the oldest houses and any surviving structures. Some dates may be approximate and based upon dendochronology, architectural studies, and historical records. Idaho became a territory in 1863, though few structures survive from before this time. All entries should include a citation. To be on this list the building should either have been built before 1890, or be the oldest building of its kind in Idaho.

See also 

 List of the oldest buildings in the United States

References 

Idaho
Architecture in Idaho
oldest